Mungtu Ram Jaipuria was an Indian social worker, industrialist and educationist and the founder of Seth M.R. Jaipuria Schools. The Government of India awarded him Padma Bhushan, the third highest Indian civilian award, in 1971.

Family 
He was the son of Seth Anandaram Jaipuria who belonged to Nawalgarh but migrated to Kolkatta and Kanpur later.

Industries 
He managed several industries, such as sugar mills, textile spinning, and weaving, etc. He partnered with one of the oldest textile mills in India. Swadeshi cotton mills at Kanpur which was acquired by National Textile Corporation in 1978.

See also

Seth Anandram Jaipuria College
Seth M.R.Jaipuria School, Lucknow
Jaipuria Vidyalaya
Rajaram Jaipuria

References

Recipients of the Padma Bhushan in social work
Year of birth missing
Year of death missing
Social workers
Indian philanthropists
Indian industrialists
Social workers from Uttar Pradesh
Businesspeople from Jaipur